The Faculty of History at the University of Oxford organises that institution's teaching and research in medieval and modern history. Medieval and modern history has been taught at Oxford for longer than at virtually any other university, and the first Regius Professor of Modern History was appointed in 1724. The Faculty is part of the Humanities Division, and has been based at the former City of Oxford High School for Boys on George Street, Oxford since the summer of 2007, while the department's library relocated from the former Indian Institute on Catte Street to the Bodleian Library's Radcliffe Camera in August 2012.

Research groups

Britain and Europe Group
Centre for Early Modern British and Irish History
Centre for the History of Childhood
Late Antique & Byzantine Studies
Modern European History Research Centre
OxCRUSH: Oxford Centre for Research in United States History
Oxford Centre for Medieval History
Research Cluster in History of Science, Medicine and Technology
Wellcome Unit for History of Medicine, Oxford

Notable academics

Martin Biddle
John Blair
Judith M. Brown
Averil Cameron
Richard Carwardine
Thomas Charles-Edwards
Barry Cunliffe
Norman Davies
Robert John Weston Evans
R. F. Foster
Timothy Garton Ash
Robert Gildea
Pekka Hämäläinen
Brian Harrison
Peter Harrison
Felicity Heal
Daniel Walker Howe
Martin Kemp
Yasmin Khan
Alan Knight
Paul Langford
Sir Colin Lucas
Diarmaid MacCulloch
Margaret MacMillan
Henry Mayr-Harting
Avner Offer
Francis Robinson
Lyndal Roper
George Rousseau
Robert Service
Richard Sharpe
Paul Slack
Sir Hew Strachan
Sir Keith Thomas
Christopher Wickham
Blair Worden

Notable alumni

(See also the 'Historians' section of the page List of University of Oxford people in academic disciplines.)

Clement Attlee, Prime Minister of the United Kingdom
Matthew d'Ancona, former Editor of the Spectator
Norman Davies
Niall Ferguson
John Gorton, Prime Minister of Australia
Graham Greene
Dominic Grieve, Attorney General of the United Kingdom
Harald V of Norway, King of Norway
T. E. Lawrence
George Osborne, Chancellor of the Exchequer
Michael Palin
Lester B. Pearson, Prime Minister of Canada
John Redwood, former Secretary of State for Wales
Evelyn Waugh
Andrew Lloyd Webber
Eric Williams, Prime Minister of Trinidad and Tobago
Harold Wilson, Prime Minister of the United Kingdom

References

History